The Galleria at Erieview is a two-floor shopping mall that opened in 1987 in Cleveland, Ohio, United States, on the east side of the city's downtown. It is adjacent to the Erieview Tower, a 40-story office building. The Galleria is a few blocks away from the Rock and Roll Hall of Fame.

History 
The concept for the Galleria began in 1985, when Richard E. Jacobs, who had just bought the Cleveland Indians baseball team, also bought the Tower at Erieview, which had opened in 1964. Jacobs began planning to convert the plaza that lay in front of the tower into a shopping centre to serve the Cleveland area. The result was the Galleria, a glass-enclosed  mall, which opened in late 1987. It was the first major retail venture in Downtown Cleveland since the 1920s.

Although the Galleria sparked Cleveland's downtown revitalization in the 1990s, it lost footfall due to lack of positive perception and a lack of a department store anchor. By 2005, the mall had only 36 active tenants, out of a possible 66.

In 2003, The Galleria and Tower at Erieview was purchased by Werner Minshall, who proposed closing the mall and converting it into a convention centre. When this failed, Minshall filled the mall with local tenants. Development was slow, but a few local businesses purchased retail space, and several local vendors began setting up stands during the week, selling goods. 

The Galleria was noted for the business "Gardens under Glass", an urban farm beneath the mall's atrium, but the Gardens closed in 2013.

The Parker Hannifin Downtown YMCA moved in to occupy a considerable portion of the Galleria and is now open. 

In 2019, James Kassouf and a group of investors purchased the property for $17.7 million.

References

External links

 Galleria home page

Buildings and structures in Cleveland
Shopping malls in Cuyahoga County, Ohio
Tourist attractions in Cleveland
Shopping malls established in 1987
Urban agriculture